Aleksandra Albu (also transliterated Alexandra; born 14 July 1990) is a Moldovan-born Russian mixed martial artist. Albu previously competed in the Ultimate Fighting Championship’s strawweight division.

Mixed martial arts career

Early career
Alexandra Albu has competed in karate, crossfit, and bodybuilding competitions.

Ultimate Fighting Championship

Albu was expected to make her promotional debut against Julie Kedzie at UFC Fight Night 33 on 6 December 2013. However, Albu was forced to pull out of the bout due to a knee injury.

Albu made her eventual debut on 11 April 2015 at UFC Fight Night 64 against Izabela Badurek.  Albu defeated Badurek in the second round with a guillotine choke.

In July 2017 after a two-year hiatus, Albu returned to UFC with a match against American fighter Kailin Curran. Albu won by unanimous decision.

Albu faced Emily Whitmire on 17 February 2019 at UFC on ESPN 1. She lost the fight via submission in the first round.

Albu faced promotional newcomer Loma Lookboonmee on 26 October 2019 at UFC on ESPN+ 20. She lost the fight via split decision.

In February 2021, it was reported that Albu and UFC had parted ways.

Personal life
Albu is currently a student at the Academy of Intellectual Property.
Her nickname, Stitch, comes from the fictional character Stitch from the movie Lilo & Stitch.

She officially represents Russia after several years of living and training in Moscow.

Mixed martial arts record

|-
|Loss
|align=center|3–2
|Loma Lookboonmee
|Decision (split)
|UFC Fight Night: Maia vs. Askren 
|
|align=center|3
|align=center|5:00
|Kallang, Singapore
| 
|-
|Loss
|align=center|3–1
|Emily Whitmire
|Submission (rear-naked choke)	
|UFC on ESPN: Ngannou vs. Velasquez 
|
|align=center|1
|align=center|1:01
|Phoenix, Arizona, United States
|
|-
| Win
| style="text-align:center;"| 3–0
|Kailin Curran
|Decision (unanimous)
|UFC 214
|
|align=center|3
|align=center|5:00
|Anaheim, California, United States
|
|-
| Win
| style="text-align:center;"| 2–0
|Izabela Badurek
|Submission (guillotine choke)
|UFC Fight Night: Gonzaga vs. Cro Cop 2
|
|align=center|2
|align=center|3:34
|Kraków, Poland
|
|-
| Win
| style="text-align:center;"| 1–0
| Lyubov Demidova
|TKO (punches)
|Octagon Fight Club
|
|align=center|1
|align=center|3:13
| Moscow, Russia
|
|-

References

External links

1990 births 
People from Gagauzia
Russian female mixed martial artists
Moldovan female mixed martial artists
Russian female karateka
Russian female judoka
Moldovan female karateka
Moldovan female judoka
Living people
Strawweight mixed martial artists 
Mixed martial artists utilizing karate
Mixed martial artists utilizing judo
Russian female bodybuilders
Ultimate Fighting Championship female fighters